Special Criminal Investigation, also known as S.C.I. for short or as Chase HQ II: Special Criminal Investigation in some home versions, is a 1989 vehicular combat racing game published by Taito for arcades. It is the sequel to the 1988 original Chase H.Q.

Gameplay

Instead of the black Porsche 928 of the first game, the player commands a red example of the just-introduced (at the time) Nissan 300ZX Z32 T-Top Turbo. Unlike the first game, the player is able to fire at offending vehicles, with some cabinets containing buttons on the steering wheel, and others having a fire button on the gearshift, along with a button to activate the nitrous boost.

The game brings back protagonists Tony Gibson and Det. Raymond Broady of the first game, and their second game appearance. Broady has taken over the driver's seat this time, while Gibson, as the passenger, serves as the gunman. Also, instead of Nancy, Karen is the officer delivering reports of whom the criminal is pursuing, and what they are driving.

Ports and related releases
Conversions for Amiga, Atari ST, PC, Commodore 64 and ZX Spectrum were released in 1991 by Ocean Software, developed by Glasgow's ICE Software. A conversion for the PC Engine (TurboGrafx-16) was released in January 1991 exclusively in Japan by Taito. Natsume ported it to the Sega Master System. An Amstrad plus/GX4000 version was written but never released, and only a small number of cartridges are known to exist.

In 1996, Taito released an emulation of the arcade original for the Sega Saturn in Japan, bundled together with Chase H.Q. on one disc.

Reception

In Japan, Game Machine listed Special Criminal Investigation on their December 1, 1989 issue as being the second most-successful upright arcade unit of the month. It went on to become Japan's third highest-grossing dedicated arcade game of 1990, below Super Monaco GP and Winning Run Suzuka GP. The arcade game was also a major hit in Europe, particularly the United Kingdom where Taito shipped 1,500 units by January 1990.

References

External links

1989 video games
Amiga games
Amstrad CPC games
Arcade video games
Atari ST games
Commodore 64 games
ICE Software games
Ocean Software games
Master System games
TurboGrafx-16 games
ZX Spectrum games
Virtual Console games
Taito arcade games
Taito Z System games
Vehicular combat games
Video games about police officers
Video games scored by Hiroyuki Iwatsuki
Video games developed in Japan